Cinderella Faye Elle Obeñita (born January 3, 1996), also known as Cindy Obeñita, is a Filipino model and beauty pageant titleholder. She was crowned Miss Intercontinental 2021 taking place in Egypt on October 29, 2021. Before that, she was crowned Binibining Pilipinas Intercontinental 2021.

Early life and education 

Obeñita was born on January 3, 1996, and raised in Cagayan de Oro, Philippines. She earned a bachelor's degree in mass communication from the Liceo de Cagayan University. She graduated magna cum laude. Obeñita works as head of the planning and events division of the Provincial Tourism Office in Misamis Oriental. On December 13, 2019, Obeñita took part in a medical mission at the Sacred Heart Parish in Cagayan de Oro, Philippines.

Pageantry

Binibining Pilipinas 2021 
On 11 July 2021, Obeñita represented Cagayan de Oro at Binibining Pilipinas 2021 in Quezon City, Metro Manila, Philippines. Receiving the most votes online, she won the People's Choice award and automatically earned a spot in the Top 13.

At the end of the event, Obeñita was named Binibining Pilipinas Intercontinental 2021 by Binibining Pilipinas Intercontinental 2019, Emma Tiglao.

Miss Intercontinental 2021 
On October 29, 2021, Obeñita represented Philippines at Miss Intercontinental 2021 and competed with 71 other candidates at the Hotel Sunrise Diamond Beach Resort in Sharm el-Sheikh, Egypt.

At the end of the event, Obeñita won the competition and was crowned as Miss Intercontinental 2021 by the title holder Fanni Mikó from Hungary. Obeñita is the second title holder of Philippines after Karen Gallman won Miss Intercontinental 2018.

References

External links

People from Misamis Oriental
1996 births
Living people
Binibining Pilipinas winners
Filipino female models
Women television journalists
Filipino television news anchors